Venezia Mestre Rugby FC, also known as Casinò di Venezia for sponsorship's reasons, was an Italian rugby union club  based in Venice in Veneto.
They were formed in 1986 following the merger of two clubs: Venezia Rugby Football Club (founded 1948) and Rugby Mestre (founded 1965).

In 1993-1994 they finished first but were denied promotion to Serie B because of a regulation requiring an under 14 team was not met.
Promotion to Serie B finally came in 1999-2000, two years later they took part in Serie A.
In 2004-2005 they were again promoted to the Super 10, the top tier of Italian rugby union.

Financial problems led the club to bankruptcy and eventual disband in 2011.

Italian rugby union teams
Rugby clubs established in 1986
Sports clubs disestablished in 2011